Shipley Gate railway station served the town of Shipley, Derbyshire, England from 1851 to 1948 on the Erewash Valley Line.

History 
The station opened on 1 July 1851 by the Midland Railway. It closed to passengers on 27 August 1948.

References

External links 

Disused railway stations in Derbyshire
Former Midland Railway stations
Railway stations in Great Britain opened in 1851
Railway stations in Great Britain closed in 1948
1851 establishments in England
1948 disestablishments in England